Quincy van Ommeren (born 25 May 1974 in Amsterdam, Netherlands) is a Dutch footballer who played for Eerste Divisie league clubs FC Volendam during the 1998–2002 seasons and MVV Maastricht during the 2004–2005 season.

References

1974 births
Living people
Dutch footballers
Footballers from Amsterdam
FC Volendam players
MVV Maastricht players
Eerste Divisie players

Association footballers not categorized by position